The 9th Golden Bell Awards was held on 26 March 1973 at the Zhongshan Hall in Taipei, Taiwan. The ceremony was hosted by Chiang Yen-shi.

Winners

References

1973
1973 in Taiwan